The 1990 Benson & Hedges Open was a men's tennis tournament played on outdoor hard courts at the ASB Tennis Centre in Auckland in New Zealand and was part of the World Series of the 1990 ATP Tour. The tournament ran from 8 January through 14 January 1990. Eighth-seeded Scott Davis won the singles title.

Finals

Singles

 Scott Davis defeated  Andrei Chesnokov 4–6, 6–3, 6–3
 It was Davis' 1st title of the year and the 13th of his career.

Doubles

 Kelly Jones /  Robert Van't Hof defeated  Gilad Bloom /  Paul Haarhuis 7–6, 6–0
 It was Jones' 1st title of the year and the 5th of his career. It was Van't Hof's 1st title of the year and the 7th of his career.

References

External links
 
 ATP – tournament profile
 ITF – tournament edition details

Benson and Hedges Open
ATP Auckland Open
Benson and Hedges Open
January 1990 sports events in New Zealand